James Frey was a Swiss dean in Ireland  in the first half of the 16th century.

Johann Jacob Frey was born in Basel  on 6 June 1606.  On 15 November 1635, Frey was appointed Dean of Armagh by James Ussher. He was at that time Professor of Greek at the University of Basel. While the Basel authorities were debating whether to grant him leave to take up his post in Ireland, he died of a fever on 28 August 1636, just 30 years old.

References

Irish Anglicans
1606 births
People from Basel-Stadt